The Australian myotis (Myotis australis) is a species of vesper bat. It is found only in Australia. 
This taxa may not represent a valid species.
Only one specimen has ever been documented, supposedly from New South Wales.
This specimen may have been mislabelled or a vagrant Myotis muricola or Myotis ater.

Taxonomy and etymology
It was described as a new species in 1878 by Irish zoologist George Edward Dobson.
Dobson named it as Vespertilio australis.
Due to concerns about the accuracy of Dobson's initial record, as well as the fact that the species has not been detected since, the Australian myotis is largely regarded as an erroneous record.
The large-footed myotis is generally considered as the only member of its genus in Australia.

Description
Its fur is brown, short, and dense.
The uropatagium has a "narrow but distinct" calcar.
Its tragi are slightly curved.

Range and habitat
It is only known from New South Wales, Australia.

Conservation
As of 2020, it is listed as a data deficient species by the IUCN.
It meets the criteria for this classification because of ongoing doubts surrounding its taxonomic validity and a lack of information about its range, biology, and threats it faces.

References

Mouse-eared bats
Mammals described in 1878
Taxonomy articles created by Polbot
Bats of Australia
Taxa named by George Edward Dobson